Clayton Vette (born September 5, 1988) is an American professional basketball player, who last played for Okapi Aalst of the Pro Basketball League (PBL).

Professional career
On July 25, 2017, Vette signed with ZZ Leiden of the Dutch Basketball League. On July 6, 2018, Vette re-signed with Leiden. On March 31, 2019, Vette and Leiden won the NBB Cup.

In the 2019 offseason, Vette signed with Okapi Aalstar of the Belgian Pro Basketball League (PBL).

References

1988 births
Living people
American expatriate basketball people in Belgium
American expatriate basketball people in the Czech Republic
American expatriate basketball people in Hungary
American expatriate basketball people in the Netherlands
American men's basketball players
Antwerp Giants players
B.S. Leiden players
Basketball players from Iowa
Iowa State Cyclones men's basketball players
Landstede Hammers players
Okapi Aalstar players
People from Waverly, Iowa
Power forwards (basketball)
Sluneta Ústí nad Labem players
SZTE-Szedeák players
Winona State Warriors men's basketball players
ZZ Leiden players